Victor Man (born 1974) is a Romanian-born artist and painter with Hungarian ancestry.

Career 
In the late nineties, Victor Man enrolled as a student at the Academia de Arte Plastice, Cluj, but left after two years in order to study under the tutelage of Israel Hershberg at the Jerusalem Studio School in Israel, between 2000 and 2004. While in Jerusalem, he lived for three years at the Monastère de Sainte Claire, and during this time mainly painted from nature inside of the monastery garden. After completing his studies with Hershberg, Man returned to Cluj in 2004 and finished his Bachelor of Fine Arts.

From 2005 onward his method of painting changed radically, from the previous observational ‘premier coup’ paintings, executed during his study years in Jerusalem, to more conceptually charged paintings, produced through a slow and methodical process.

Victor Man received the 2014 Deutsche Bank “Artist of the Year” award, followed by a solo exhibition at the Deutsche Bank KunstHalle, Berlin, which traveled further to Zachęta Museum of Art, Warsaw, and Haus der Kunst, Munich.

In 2007 he represented Romania at the Venice Biennale, together with the artists Cristi Pogacean, Mona Vatamanu and Florin Tudor.

In 2015 he contributed to the Venice Biennale a second time, when his work
was featured in the main exhibition, “All The World's Futures,” curated by Okwui Enwezor in the Central Pavilion.

In 2016 Galerie Neu in Berlin hosted an exhibition of Man's work.

Work 
Man often has a preference for painting in dark colors, reminiscent of the work of 18th century landscape painters, who used black mirrors, also known as “Claude mirrors,” to turn colors into dark key tones. His works capture moods, offering the onlooker nothing but ambiguous, vague tracks, and leaving him or her in a haze. They also render a memory of images and objects made up of different layers of time, which appear to waver between disappearance and reminiscence. Victor Man’s highly personal poetics and the illustrative diversity of his output trace the outlines of an artistic world in which historical facts and subjective impressions coming from different worlds and periods are grounded.
Man is said to be equally inspired by the ancient and the modern.

In his work he concentrates on the development of an autonomous iconography in which frequent literary references intermingle with his own biography. Literature and art history, collective memory and personal experience, are the elements woven together by the artist into a non-linear story where distinctions between present and past, fiction, imagination and reality are abolished.
Uncertainty and oscillation between gender find an echo in other forms of transition: from human to animal, organic to artificial, face to mask.
This overlapping of points of reference runs throughout all his works, where the fusion of occult, gender, androgyny, or, more generally, the uncertainty of physiognomy and appearance form a recurrent theme that strengthens the image of an identity in perpetual movement and suggests how rich and mysterious the essence of things can be beyond their appearance. The paintings never provide explanations, but hints and suggestions that leave the viewer with the feeling that a reversal of all meanings is always possible.

Public collections 
TATE Modern, London
 Centre Georges Pompidou, Paris 
 Mudam, Grand Duke Jean Museum of Modern Art, Luxembourg
 GAMeC Galleria d’Arte Moderna e Contemporanea di Bergamo
 Museum Boijmans Van Beuningen, Rotterdam
 SFMOMA Museum of Modern Art San Francisco, San Francisco, CA 
 Centre International d'art et du Paysage de l'ile de Vassiviere 
 MNAC, National Museum of Contemporary Art, Bucharest 
 Collection of Contemporary Art of the Federal Republic of Germany 
 LACMA, Los Angeles County Museum, CA

References 

Romanian painters
1974 births
Living people
 21st-century Romanian painters